Danley Johnson (born August 2, 1978) is a Canadian former soccer player who played in the USL A-League, and the Canadian Professional Soccer League.

Playing career 
Johnson played in the Ontario Soccer League in 1996 with Soccer Academy.In 1997, he began his professional career in 1997, with expansion franchise Toronto Lynx of the USL A-League. He assisted the club in qualifying for the post season for the first time in the franchise's history by finishing 4th in the Northeastern division. The Lynx were eliminated in the first round of the playoffs against the Montreal Impact. He returned to the Lynx the following year where he appeared in 9 matches, He scored his first goal for the club on May 8, 1998 in a match against Worcester Wildfire. Unfortunately the organization failed to make the post season by finishing second last in their division. 

In 2001, he signed with the Toronto Olympians of the Canadian Professional Soccer League, re-uniting with former Toronto Lynx general manager David Gee. He helped the club reach the postseason by finishing second in the overall standings, but were eliminated in the semi-finals.

International career  
Johnson played with the Canada men's national under-17 soccer team, and made his debut on November 2, 1994 against Nicaragua at the 1994 CONCACAF U-17 Tournament.In total he made six appearances and recorded three goals. In 1997, he was called by Bruce Twamley to the Canada men's national under-20 soccer team camp in British Columbia.He was selected for the Canada U20 team that won the gold metal in the 1997 Jeux de la Francophonie.

References  

1978 births
Living people
Canadian soccer players
Canadian Soccer League (1998–present) players
Soccer people from Ontario
Toronto Lynx players
Toronto (Mississauga) Olympians players
A-League (1995–2004) players
Association football forwards
Canada men's youth international soccer players